is a Japanese animated film series based on the Persona 3 video game by Atlus. There are four films in the series, subtitled No. 1, Spring of Birth (2013), No. 2, Midsummer Knight's Dream (2014), Persona 3 The Movie: No. 3, Falling Down (2015), and Persona 3 The Movie: #4 Winter of Rebirth (2016).

Voice cast

Production

Reception

Persona 3 The Movie: #1 Spring of Birth made a gross earning of US$1,956,267 and was ranked at 118 in Japan at the end of 2013 by Box Office Mojo.

References

External links
 Official website 
 Persona 3 The Movie at Aniplex 
 

Animated film series
Japanese film series
Anime International Company
Films based on role-playing video games
Anime films based on video games
Megami Tensei anime
Persona (series)
Films set in 2009
Films set in 2010